Sir Thomas Walsingham (c. 1589 - April 1669) was an English politician who sat in the House of Commons  at various times between 1614 and  1640. He supported the Parliamentarian side in the English Civil War.

Life
Walsingham was the son of Thomas Walsingham (literary patron) and his wife Lady Audrey Shelton. He  was knighted at Royston on 26 November 1613. In 1614 he was elected Member of Parliament for Poole. He was elected MP for Rochester in 1621 and again in 1628 and held the seat until 1629 when King Charles I decided to rule without parliament for eleven years. He was made vice-admiral of Kent in 1627.

In April 1640, Walsingham was re-elected MP for Rochester for the Short Parliament and again in November 1640 for the Long Parliament when he sat until 1653, surviving Pride's Purge. He sold the family property of Scadbury in around 1655.

Walsingham died in 1669 and was buried at Chislehurst on 10 April 1669.

Family
Walsingham married twice, his first wife being Elizabeth Manwood, daughter of Sir Peter Manwood, who died giving birth to a daughter in January 1616.

References

 
 

1669 deaths
English MPs 1614
English MPs 1621–1622
English MPs 1624–1625
English MPs 1625
English MPs 1626
English MPs 1628–1629
English MPs 1640 (April)
English MPs 1640–1648
Year of birth uncertain